Wojciech Szczęsny Marczewski (born 28 February 1944) is a Polish film director and screenwriter. He directed twelve films between 1968 and 2001.

His 1981 film Dreszcze won the Silver Bear - Special Jury Prize at the 32nd Berlin International Film Festival. His film Ucieczka z kina "Wolność" was screened in the Un Certain Regard section at the 1991 Cannes Film Festival.

Filmography
 Lekcja anatomii (1968)
 Most nad torami (1968)
 Podróżni jak inni (1969)
 Bielszy niż śnieg (1975)
 Wielkanoc (1975)
 Zmory (Nightmares) (1979)
 Klucznik (1980)
 Dreszcze (1981)
 Ucieczka z kina "Wolność" (1990)
 Czas zdrady (1997)
 Weiser (2001)

References

External links

Wojciech Marczewski at the Culture.pl 

1944 births
Living people
Film people from Łódź
Polish film directors
Polish screenwriters